Heo Seok Kim Bo-sung (born Heo Seok; June 27, 1966) is a South Korean actor.

Awards and nominations

References

External links

1966 births
Living people
South Korean male television actors
South Korean male film actors
South Korean male stage actors
South Korean male musical theatre actors
South Korean people with disabilities
People from Gangneung
Heo clan of Yangcheon
Best New Actor Paeksang Arts Award (film) winners